Grabowski is a Polish surname with forms in various languages (Grabovsky, Grabauskas, Hraboŭski, or Hrabovskyi). The Belarusian and Ukrainian variants are generally transcribed beginning with an 'h' but may also be written with a 'g'.

Grabowski is the 20th most common surname in Poland (59,052 people in 2009).

Related surnames

People

Grabowski/Grabowska 
 Achim Grabowski, German ten-pin bowler
 Adam Stanisław Grabowski, Polish bishop
 Al Grabowski (1901–1966), baseball pitcher 
 Aleksandra 'Ola' Grabowska (born 1982), Polish-British dancer
 Ałbena Grabowska (born 1971), Polish writer and neurologist
 Andrzej Grabowski (born 1952), Polish actor
 Antoni Grabowski (1857–1921), Polish Esperantist
 Barbara Grabowska (1954–1994), Polish actress
 Bartosz Grabowski (born 2000), Polish sprint canoeist
 Bernard F. Grabowski (1923–2019), American lawyer and politician
 Damian Grabowski (born 1980), Polish mixed martial artist
 Dariusz Grabowski (born 1950), Polish politician
 Dominika Grabowska (born 1998), Polish footballer
 Elżbieta Grabowska (1748–1810), Polish nobility
 Ewa Grabowska (born 1962), Polish alpine skier
 Geoffrey C. Grabowski (born 1973), American game designer
 Gene Grabowski (disambiguation), multiple individuals
 Genowefa Grabowska (born 1944), Polish politician
 Gerd Grabowski (born 1949), German singer
 Halina Grabowski (1928–2003), member of the Polish resistance movement
 Heinrich Emanuel Grabowski (1792–1842), German botanist and pharmacist of Polish heritage
 Helena Willman-Grabowska (1870–1957), Polish indologist
 Henryk Grabowski (disambiguation), multiple individuals
  (1776–1858), Polish noblewoman
 Jadwiga Grabowska-Hawrylak (1920–2018), Polish architect
 Jan Grabowski (disambiguation), multiple individuals
 Janusz Grabowski (born 1955), Polish mathematician
 Jasmin Grabowski (born 1991), German judoka
 Jason Grabowski (born 1976), American baseball player
 Jedrek Grabowski (born 1982), English professional wrestler
 Jim Grabowski (born 1944), American football player
 Johnny Grabowski (1900–1946), catcher in Major League Baseball
 Juan Grabowski (born 1982), Argentine footballer
 Jürgen Grabowski (1944–2022), West German footballer
 Klementyna Grabowska (1771–1831), Polish pianist and composer
 Klaus Grabowski, German murderer killed by Marianne Bachmeier, mother of his victim
 Krzysztof Grabowski (born 1965), Polish poet, singer
 Laura Grabowski 
 Lena Grabowski (born 2002), Austrian swimmer
 Maciej Grabowski (died 1750), Polish-Lithuanian nobleman and politician
 Maciej Grabowski (sailor) (born 1978), Polish sailor
 Marcin Grabowski (born 2000), Polish footballer
 Marek Grabowski (born 1964), Polish footballer
 Marek Grabowski (politician) (1950–2022), Polish doctor and politician
 Mateusz Grabowski (1904–1976), Polish pharmacist and art gallery owner
 Max Grabowski (1874-1946), Grabowski Motor Company/GMC (automobile) founder
 Mercedes Grabowski (1994–2017), Canadian pornographic actress
 Michał Grabowski (1773–1812), Polish general
 Michał Grabowski (author) (1804–1863), Polish author
 Morris Grabowski, Grabowski Motor Company/GMC (automobile) founder
 Norm Grabowski (1933–2012), American hot rod builder and actor
 Mena Grabowski Trott (born 1977), American businesswoman
 Peter Grabowski, East German slalom canoeist
 Petra Grabowski (born 1952), East German sprint canoeist
 Robert Grabowski (born 1956), American musician
 Reggie Grabowski (1907–1955), baseball pitcher
 Stephen Grabowski (born 1952), American politician
 Urszula Grabowska (born 1976), Polish TV actress
 Wiesław Grabowski, Polish football coach
 Władysław Grabowski (1883–1961), Polish theater & film actor, mostly comedies in the 1930s
 Zygmunt Grabowski (1891–1939), Polish painter

Grabowsky
 Adolf Grabowsky (1880–1969), German political scientist
 Jessica Grabowsky (born 1980), Finnish actress
 Nicholas Grabowsky (born 1966), American author
 Paul Grabowsky (born 1958), Australian pianist and composer

Grabovsky/Grabovskyy/Grabovskii
 Boris Grabovsky (1901–1966), Soviet engineer
 Dmytro Grabovskyy (1985–2017), Ukrainian road bicycle racer
 Igor Grabovsky (born 1941), Soviet water polo player
 Mikhail Grabovski (born 1984), Belarusian ice hockey player

Hrabovsky
 Leonid Hrabovsky (born 1935), Ukrainian composer
 Valentin Hrabovsky (1937–2004), Ukrainian poet

Other 
 Grabowsky Motor Corporation, the pre-1912 predecessor of GMC Truck
 Grabowski Prize, prize for young authors writing in Esperanto
 Laurel Rose Willson (alias Laura Grabowski), American writer
 Gary Grobowski, Vince Vaughn character in 2006 American romantic comedy-drama film The Break-Up
 Grabowsky Motor Company, division of the American automobile manufacturer General Motors
 Grabowski Gallery, London avant-garde art gallery
 Duke Grabowski: Mighty Swashbuckler!, point-and-click adventure game

See also

References

Polish-language surnames